Tikhon of Kaluga (died 16 June 1492) was a Russian abbot and saint. He grew up in Moscow and became a monk as a young man. He then moved to a forest near Medin in Kaluga, living in the hollow of an oak tree. It was on that spot that he founded (and became the first abbot of) a monastery, dedicated to the Dormition of the Mother of God (and then to Tikhon himself after his death).

External links
Orthodox America - Tikhon of Kaluga

1492 deaths
Russian saints
Russian abbots
Year of birth unknown